The notch tensile strength  (NTS) of a material is the value given by performing a standard tensile strength test on a notched specimen of the material.  The ratio between the NTS and the tensile strength is called the notch strength ratio (NSR).

See also
 Charpy impact test

References

Physical quantities
Fracture mechanics
Materials testing
Elasticity (physics)